Mexichromis tura is a species of sea slug, a dorid nudibranch, a shell-less marine gastropod mollusk in the family Chromodorididae.

Distribution 
This species is recorded from the Gulf of California to Panama and the Pacific Ocean coast of Mexico. It is considered to be rare.

Description
The central part of the mantle in Mexichromis tura is dark blue with irregular yellow spots and is surrounded by a series of concentric bands. Within the edge of the dark blue area there is a row of white spots which may merge into a line, then a broad pale blue area, a narrower black band and at the edge of the mantle a bright yellow line. The rhinophores are black and the gill leaves are white with the outer third black.

Ecology

References

Chromodorididae
Gastropods described in 1967